The Ludila Dam(鲁地拉水电站 in Chinese) is a gravity dam on the Jinsha River near Lijiang in Yunnan province, China. The primary purpose of the dam is hydroelectric power generation and it will support a 2,160 MW power station. Construction on the dam began in 2007 and was briefly halted in June 2009 by the Ministry of Environmental Protection after it was being constructed without approval. On 13 June 2013 the dam's first generator became operational. In May 2014 reports surfaced that the dam and been damaged or was structurally unsound, forcing engineers to draw down the reservoir level and leaving the power station inoperable. An estimated 16,900 people were relocated after its construction.

See also 

 List of power stations in China

References

Hydroelectric power stations in Yunnan
Dams completed in 2013
Dams in China
Dams on the Jinsha River
Gravity dams
Buildings and structures in Lijiang
Buildings and structures in Dali Bai Autonomous Prefecture